In topology and related branches of mathematics, total-boundedness is a generalization of compactness for circumstances in which a set is not necessarily closed.  A totally bounded set can be covered by finitely many subsets of every fixed “size” (where the meaning of “size” depends on the structure of the ambient space).

The term precompact (or pre-compact) is sometimes used with the same meaning, but precompact is also used to mean relatively compact. These definitions coincide for subsets of a complete metric space, but not in general.

In metric spaces 

[[File:Unit square totally bounded space.png|thumb|alt=A unit square can be covered by finitely many discs of radius ε < 1/2, 1/3, 1/4|[0, 1]2 is a totally bounded space because for every ε > 0, the unit square can be covered by finitely many open discs of radius ε.]]

A metric space  is totally bounded'' if and only if for every real number , there exists a finite collection of open balls in M of radius  whose union contains . Equivalently, the metric space M is totally bounded if and only if for every , there exists a finite cover such that the radius of each element of the cover is at most . This is equivalent to the existence of a finite ε-net.  A metric space is said to be totally bounded if every sequence admits a Cauchy subsequence; in complete metric spaces, a set is compact if and only if it is closed and totally bounded.

Each totally bounded space is bounded (as the union of finitely many bounded sets is bounded).  The reverse is true for subsets of Euclidean space (with the subspace topology), but not in general.  For example, an infinite set equipped with the discrete metric is bounded but not totally bounded: every discrete ball of radius  or less is a singleton, and no finite union of singletons can cover an infinite set.

 Uniform (topological) spaces 

A metric appears in the definition of total boundedness only to ensure that each element of the finite cover is of comparable size, and can be weakened to that of a uniform structure.

The definition can be extended still further, to any category of spaces with a notion of compactness and Cauchy completion: a space is totally bounded if and only if its (Cauchy) completion is compact.

 Examples and elementary properties 
 Every compact set is totally bounded, whenever the concept is defined.
 Every totally bounded set is bounded.  
 A subset of the real line, or more generally of finite-dimensional Euclidean space, is totally bounded if and only if it is bounded.
 The unit ball in a Hilbert space, or more generally in a Banach space, is totally bounded (in the norm topology) if and only if the space has finite dimension.
 Equicontinuous bounded functions on a compact set are precompact in the uniform topology; this is the Arzelà–Ascoli theorem.
 A metric space is separable if and only if it is homeomorphic to a totally bounded metric space.
 The closure of a totally bounded subset is again totally bounded.

 Comparison with compact sets 
In metric spaces, a set is compact if and only if it is complete and totally bounded; without the axiom of choice only the forward direction holds.  Precompact sets share a number of properties with compact sets.

 Like compact sets, a finite union of totally bounded sets is totally bounded.  
 Unlike compact sets, every subset of a totally bounded set is again totally bounded.
 The continuous image of a compact set is compact.  The uniformly continuous image of a precompact set is precompact.

 In topological groups

Although the notion of total boundedness is closely tied to metric spaces, the greater algebraic structure of topological groups allows one to trade away some separation properties.  For example, in metric spaces, a set is compact if and only if complete and totally bounded.  Under the definition below, the same holds for any topological vector space (not necessarily Hausdorff nor complete).

The general logical form of the definition is: a subset  of a space  is totally bounded if and only if, given any size  there exists a finite cover  of  such that each element of  has size at most    is then totally bounded if and only if it is totally bounded when considered as a subset of itself.

We adopt the convention that, for any neighborhood  of the identity, a subset  is called  if and only if   
A subset  of a topological group  is   if it satisfies any of the following equivalent conditions:

: For any neighborhood  of the identity  there exist finitely many  such that 
For any neighborhood  of  there exists a finite subset  such that  (where the right hand side is the Minkowski sum ).
For any neighborhood  of  there exist finitely many subsets  of  such that  and each  is -small.
 is : for every neighborhood  of the identity and every countably infinite subset  of  there exist distinct  such that  (If  is finite then this condition is satisfied vacuously).
Any of the following three sets satisfies (any of the above definitions of) being (left) totally bounded:
 This set being in the list means that the following characterization holds:  is (left) totally bounded if and only if  is (left) totally bounded (according to any of the defining conditions mentioned above). The same characterization holds for the other sets listed below.
The sum 

The term  usually appears in the context of Hausdorff topological vector spaces. 
In that case, the following conditions are also all equivalent to  being (left) totally bounded:

The definition of ''' is analogous: simply swap the order of the products.

If  is not Hausdorff then, for example,  is a compact complete set that is not closed.

Topological vector spaces 

Any topological vector space is an abelian topological group under addition, so the above conditions apply.  Historically, definition 1(b) was the first reformulation of total boundedness for topological vector spaces; it dates to a 1935 paper of John von Neumann.

This definition has the appealing property that, in a locally convex space endowed with the weak topology, the precompact sets are exactly the bounded sets.

For separable Banach spaces, there is a nice characterization of the precompact sets (in the norm topology) in terms of weakly convergent sequences of functionals: if  is a separable Banach space, then  is precompact if and only if every weakly convergent sequence of functionals converges uniformly on

Interaction with convexity 

The balanced hull of a totally bounded subset of a topological vector space is again totally bounded.
The Minkowski sum of two compact (totally bounded) sets is compact (resp. totally bounded).
In a locally convex (Hausdorff) space, the convex hull and the disked hull of a totally bounded set  is totally bounded if and only if  is complete.

See also

 Compact space
 Locally compact space
 Measure of non-compactness
 Orthocompact space
 Paracompact space
 Relatively compact subspace

References

Bibliography
 
 
 
 
 
 
 

Uniform spaces
Metric geometry
Topology
Functional analysis
Compactness (mathematics)